John Francis Dunsworth (April 12, 1946 – October 16, 2017) was a Canadian actor. He was best known for playing the antagonistic trailer park supervisor Jim Lahey on the cult comedy series Trailer Park Boys (2001–2018). His other roles included the mysterious reporter Dave Teagues on the supernatural drama series Haven (2010–2015) and Officer McNabb in the CBC film Shattered City: The Halifax Explosion (2003). He also had extensive experience in regional theater.

Early life
Dunsworth was born in Bridgewater, Nova Scotia, the second of 10 children born to Frank and Frances Dunsworth. In 1988, he starred in a video documentary short titled John Dunsworth: The Candidate, which was written and directed by Neal Livingston. The film follows an underdog provincial candidate for the New Democratic Party in the riding of Halifax Bedford Basin as he campaigns, based on Dunsworth's candidacy in the 1988 Nova Scotia general election.

|-

|Progressive Conservative
|Joel Matheson
|align="right"|6,462
|align="right"|45.1%
|align="right"|
|-

|Liberal
|Penny LaRocque
|align="right"|4,977
|align="right"|34.9%
|align="right"|
|-

|New Democratic Party
|John Dunsworth
|align="right"|2,746
|align="right"|19.3%
|align="right"|
|-
|}

Career
Dunsworth studied acting at the University of Guelph, but dropped out in his fourth year. He went on to act in numerous CBC radio dramas, and had starring roles in many stage productions at the Neptune Theatre in Halifax. In 1970, Dunsworth leased an abandoned building on Halifax's waterfront, and converted it into a playhouse. Dubbing it the Pier One Theatre, it became the city's first and most successful alternative theater production house.  In the late 1980s, Dalhousie University hired Dunsworth to produce the university's Welcome Show for new students at the Rebecca Cohn Auditorium, in which he also occasionally had an unseen voice-over role. In 1987, Dunsworth founded Filmworks Casting where he worked as Halifax's most renowned casting director.  Dunsworth met director Mike Clattenburg in the mid-1990s when he tried out for a bit part in Clattenburg's film short, "One Last Shot". Dunsworth's small role gradually transformed into a leading part that earned him a Best Performance award from the Atlantic Film Festival. From there, he further developed the character into what would eventually become Jim Lahey in Trailer Park Boys.

Dunsworth, John Paul Tremblay, and Robb Wells can be seen in the 2002 movie Virginia's Run starring Gabriel Byrne and Joanne Whalley. Dunsworth plays a local cop while Tremblay and Wells play active and verbal townsmen similar to their Trailer Park Boys characters. Actors are credited as cop for John Dunsworth, J.P. for John Paul Tremblay (credits as J.P. Tremblay), and Robb Wells as Rob. The movie was filmed in Nova Scotia, Canada. Dunsworth starred in Haven, the television series adaptation of the Stephen King novel The Colorado Kid.

In 2010, Dunsworth reunited with many of his former Trailer Park Boys castmates in the new series The Drunk and On Drugs Happy Fun Time Hour.

Personal life
Dunsworth lived in his native Nova Scotia with his wife, Elizabeth, whom he married sometime after 1974. Together, they had three daughters (Sarah, Zoë, and Molly) and one son (Geoff). Two of his daughters, Sarah and Molly, are actresses.

Unlike the character he played on Trailer Park Boys, Dunsworth rarely drank alcohol; the 'alcohol' he drank in the show was usually iced tea. He admitted to suffering from a gambling problem in his early years. As a result of his recovery, he had been instrumental in trying to remove video lottery terminals from bars in Nova Scotia.

Dunsworth once appeared on stage with Guns N' Roses in Halifax, as Axl Rose is a fan of Trailer Park Boys and Dunsworth's character in particular. He was a boating enthusiast and frequently spent time on his yacht, Emerald Princess. He enjoyed building granite sculptures and structures with local stone and concrete.

Death
Dunsworth died of an initially undisclosed illness on October 16, 2017, in Halifax, Nova Scotia, at the age of 71. In a statement, Dunsworth's daughter Sarah described the illness as "short and unexpected" and stated that her father was an "amazing husband, father and grandfather". On a Facebook post written on May 26, 2021, from the "100% John Dunsworth" page, run by Dunsworth's surviving family and friends, it was revealed that he passed due to complications related to thrombotic thrombocytopenic purpura (TTP). John Dunsworth is buried at St. Anthony's & St. Augustine's Catholic Cemetery located in Simms Settlement, Nova Scotia.

Filmography
Dunsworth had 70 titles for which he is credited as an actor. Below is a selected filmography.

Film

Television

Notes
 Dunsworth is credited in Dolores Claiborne as a part of the crew but did not appear in the film.

References

External links

Official homepage

1946 births
2017 deaths
Canadian male film actors
Canadian male television actors
Canadian male voice actors
Candidates in Nova Scotia provincial elections
Male actors from Nova Scotia
People from Bridgewater, Nova Scotia
Nova Scotia New Democratic Party politicians
Deaths from thrombotic thrombocytopenic purpura